Darrell Oak (born August 30, 1954) is an American former professional soccer player who played as a forward.

Career
Born in Jamestown, North Dakota, Oak played for Seattle Sounders, Phoenix Fire and FC Seattle. In 1980 he was contracted to play with ASL expansion team the Phoenix Fire, but the team folded in pre-season.

References

1954 births
Living people
American soccer players
Seattle Sounders (1974–1983) players
Phoenix Fire (soccer) players
Seattle Storm (soccer) players
North American Soccer League (1968–1984) players
Association football forwards